Circuito de Navarra is a motorsport race track that opened in June 2010 near Los Arcos in the Navarre region of Northern Spain. It is a  permanent road course that hosted the Superleague Formula series and the FIA GT1 World Championship.

History

The circuit was inaugurated June 19, 2010 with the showing of the MotoGP Inmotec. Its first national test was held on 31 July.

On 2–4 May 2014, it was the location of the second weekend of Acceleration 2014, a series of festivals combining top class car and bike racing with music and entertainment.

In cycling, the circuit hosted the start of stage 16 of the 2017 Vuelta a España and stage 12 of the 2019 Vuelta a España.

In 2018, Navarra held the first of two Spanish rounds of the 24H Series, with the other round being held in Barcelona.

On 9 March 2021; it was announced that Navarra to host the World SBK round on the dates of 20–22 August 2021.

On 30 September 2022, it was announced that MSV won the bid for purchasing Circuito de Navarra. As part of its agreement, MSV will resurface the circuit and finalize the circuit's 2023 calendar programme along with maintaining the current management of this circuit.  The 2023 British Superbike Championship will open the 2023 season with a test session at Navarra, and in the future, is expected to host UK-based championships where MotorSport Vision circuits are currently used as venues.

Events

 Current
 March: Formula Winter Series, GT Winter Series
 April: Ultimate Cup 4 Hours of Navarra, Campeonato de España de Resistencia
 June: F4 Spanish Championship, TCR Spain Campeonato de España de Superturismos
 September: Campeonato de España de Superbike

 Former

 24H Series 12H Navarra (2018)
 Acceleration 2014 Acceleration at Navarra (2014)
 Auto GP (2010)
 Blancpain Endurance Series (2011–2012)
 European Truck Racing Championship (2013–2014)
 FFSA GT Championship (2012, 2015)
 FIA GT Series (2013)
 FIA GT1 World Championship (2010–2012)
 FIM CEV Moto3 Junior World Championship (2012–2015)
 Superbike World Championship (2021)
 Superleague Formula (2010)
 V de V Challenge Endurance GT/Tourisme (2018)
 Vuelta a España (2017, 2019)

Lap Records 

As of March 2023, the official fastest race lap records at the Circuito de Navarra are listed as:

External links

References

Sports venues in Navarre
Motorsport venues in Navarre
Superbike World Championship circuits